Night of the Living Drag Queens is the second full-length release by North Carolina punk band the Frankenstein Drag Queens from Planet 13. It was originally released on Uncle God Damn Records in 1998, and was later re-released on Century Media Records in collaboration with People Like You Records in 1999 as a Digi-Pack. It is also featured in the 2006 box set "Little Box of Horrors". "Twist My Sister", Let's Go to War" and "Die My Bride" were later re-recorded for the murderdolls album Beyond the Valley of the Murderdolls

Track listing
 Mr.Motherfucker (1:55)
 Twist My Sister (2:04)
 Let's Go to War (2:22)
 Die My Bride (3:14)
 Screwdriver (1:45)
 Scary Song (2:54)
 Rambo (2:43)
 I Love Me (2:11)
 Full Metal Jackoff (2:17)
 Crossdressing G.D.S.O.B. (1:54)
 I Don't Wanna Be Your Friend (1:57)
 STD's (1:13)
 Motel Killafornia (2:19)
 She's a Man (1:39)
 Foot In Mouth (3:13)
 Going to Hell (1:48)

Album credits
Wednesday 13: Guitar, Vocals
Sydney: Guitar
Seaweed: Bass
Sicko Zero: Drums

1998 albums
Frankenstein Drag Queens from Planet 13 albums